Markus Egger (born 15 January 1990) is an Austrian footballer who plays for SV Völs. He is now working as a teacher in the Theresianum

References

Austrian footballers
Austrian Football Bundesliga players
FC Wacker Innsbruck (2002) players
1990 births
Living people
Association football goalkeepers
WSG Tirol players